The Pyramid Hills are a mountain range in the interior California Coast Ranges, in western Kings County, California.

When viewed from afar, the conical Pyramid Hills are said to resemble pyramids, hence the name.

References 

California Coast Ranges
Mountain ranges of Kings County, California